Marvin Gaye's Greatest Hits, Vol. 2 is a compilation album of greatest hits, a second compilation by American R&B/soul singer Marvin Gaye, released on the Tamla label in 1967. This album focused on the singer's best hits from 1964 to 1966 including signature hits "How Sweet It Is (To Be Loved By You)" and "Ain't That Peculiar".

Track listing

Side one
"Try It Baby" (Berry Gordy)
"Baby Don't You Do It" (Brian Holland-Lamont Dozier-Eddie Holland)
"How Sweet It Is (To Be Loved by You)" (Holland-Dozier-Holland)
"I'll Be Doggone" (Smokey Robinson, Pete Moore, Marv Tarplin)
"Pretty Little Baby" (Mickey Stevenson, Ivy Jo Hunter)
"Ain't That Peculiar" (Robinson, Moore, Tarplin, Bobby Rogers)

Side two
"One More Heartache" (Robinson, Moore, Tarplin, Rogers, Ronnie White)
"Take This Heart of Mine" (Robinson, Tarplin, Moore)
"Little Darling I Need You" (Robinson, Moore)
"Forever" (Holland–Dozier–Freddie Gorman)
"Hey Diddle Diddle"
"Your Unchanging Love" (Holland-Dozier-Holland)

Personnel
Lead vocals by Marvin Gaye
Background vocals by The Andantes (side 1, tracks 2-6; side 2, tracks 1-3, 5-6), The Spinners (side 2, track 5), The Temptations (side 1, track 1),  and The Miracles (side 1, track 4)
Instrumentation by The Funk Brothers

References

1967 greatest hits albums
Marvin Gaye compilation albums
Albums produced by Smokey Robinson
Albums produced by Berry Gordy
Albums produced by Brian Holland
Albums produced by Lamont Dozier
Albums produced by William "Mickey" Stevenson
Tamla Records albums